Chris Clarke (born 1 May 1974) is a former English footballer who played as a goalkeeper.

References

1974 births
Living people
English footballers
Association football goalkeepers
Rochdale A.F.C. players
English Football League players